The following is a list of presidents of Central Philippine University from its founding in 1905 up to the present. The president is required by the university to be of the Baptist or any Protestant denomination:

Note: Postwar (1945-1947) heads - Urbano F. Nequin (Postwar Reopening Managing Committee: Chairman, Registrar) and May A. Coggins (Faculty Council: Chairman) are not included.

References

Central Philippine University people
Central Philippine University alumni
Central Philippine University
1905 establishments in the Philippines